Tyson Stengle (born 19 October 1998) is a professional Australian rules footballer who plays for the Geelong Cats in the Australian Football League (AFL). Stengle played junior representative football with Woodville-West Torrens in the SANFL and represented South Australia at national championships at under 18 level. He was drafted by the Richmond Tigers in the 2017 rookie draft, made his AFL debut in round 15, 2017 and was traded to the Adelaide Crows in the 2018 trade period. He was delisted by Adelaide prior to the 2021 AFL season, but proceeded to join the Geelong Cats in 2022, winning the premiership with them that year.

Early life and junior football
Stengle was taken in by his grandmother, Debra, at the age of four after he and his brother were removed by the state from the care of their parents. He later lived with grandparents Emily and Cecil Betts after Debra died. He spent his teenage years in the northwestern Adelaide suburb of Ethelton where he completed secondary schooling at Le Fevre High School.

Stengle first played football for the local Portland Football Club at under 10s level. There he played in over 100 matches across his junior years.

As a teenager he was a member of 's Aboriginal AFL Academy.

Stengle played state-league football with Woodville-West Torrens in the South Australian National Football League. He played 10 matches for the reserves team in 2016 and kicked 22 goals, while he kicked 13 in nine matches with the club's Under 18 team that same season. He was a member of the Eagles' reserves Grand Final team in 2016.

In 2016 he represented South Australia at the National Under 18 Championships. There he ranked second among all small-forwards for Champion Data ranking points per game. Stengle was also the fourth ranked of all South Australians by the same measure that tournament. He was labelled "quick, creative, innovative and classy" by The Age draft writer Emma Quayle for his performances in the championships. The Advertiser's Andrew Capel said Stengle possessed "brilliant skills, blistering pace and a love of tackling and applying ferocious forward pressure." Stengle recorded a top 10 score in the goalkicking test at the national draft combine in 2016.

AFL career

Richmond (2017–2018)

Stengle played in the early part of the 2017 season with Richmond's reserves side in the VFL. He was a key forward-line player for the side, kicking 13 goals in his first eight matches.
He was upgraded to the club's senior list in June 2017. He played again the following match but was omitted from the team's round 17 side to play the week after. From there he returned to the club's reserves side, playing with the team through to their finals campaign. There he played in each of their three victories, and in the team's losing grand final against Port Melbourne. Stengle finished the 2017 season having played two matches and kicked two goals at senior level. He also played 19 matches in the reserves and kicked 33 goals, good for the second most at the club and sixth most in the league.

In February 2018 Stengle was selected alongside most of the club's younger players to represent Richmond at the Sydney tournament of the AFLX exhibition series. He started the season-proper with the club's reserves side, but was immediately impressive at that level with a 20 disposal and three-goal game in round 1. By round 5 he was named as an emergency for the AFL team, but ultimately went unselected at the top level. In mid-May Stengle turned in a three-goal third quarter during a VFL match with North Melbourne that saw him again named an AFL emergency the next week. He began playing limited midfield minutes in VFL matches from June, adding positional versatility to his predominantly forward-line role. In mid-July Stengle turned in his best performance of the year to-date, kicking a bag of six goals while gathering 24 disposals in Richmond's VFL win over North Melbourne. For that performance he was noted by head coach Damien Hardwick as one of the club's best VFL performers, but went again un-selected for senior football. To that point he had played 13 matches at the lower level for a total of 26 goals, the most for any Richmond player and the sixth most of any player in that league. Two weeks later Stengle suffered a minor ankle injury while playing in a VFL match against . He missed the second half of the match due to the injury as well as one further match while rehabilitating the injury. Stengle finished the home and away VFL season with 33 goals, good for eighth most of any player in the league. He won the club's reserves goal-kicking medal for his 33 goals over 19 matches in the VFL, but failed to earn an AFL match in 2018.

Less than a week out from the beginning of the trade period, Stengle requested a trade to Adelaide citing a lack of AFL-level opportunity during his time at Richmond.

Adelaide (2018–2020) 

Stengle's career with the Adelaide Football Club ended when he was delisted on 17 March 2021 prior to the 2021 AFL season as a result of a settlement relating to off-field incidents.

2021
In 2021 Stengle returned to his original club, the Woodville West Torrens Eagles where he played a major role in their back to back SANFL premiership, which underpinned a possible return to the AFL for 2022.

Geelong (2022–)
After receiving a lifeline by Geelong at the end of 2021, Stengle made his club debut in Round 1 vs Essendon, kicking a career-high four goals. He cemented his spot in the side for the season, playing all 22 games and kicking 46 goals during the home and away season, finishing 12th in the Coleman Medal in his first year at Geelong. Stengle was selected as a forward pocket in the 2022 All-Australian team, along with fellow Geelong player Tom Hawkins.

Statistics
Updated to the end of the 2022 season.

|-
| 2017 ||  || 44
| 2 || 2 || 1 || 11 || 5 || 16 || 4 || 4 || 1.0 || 0.5 || 5.5 || 2.5 || 8.0 || 2.0 || 2.0 || 0
|-
| 2018 ||  || 44
| 0 || — || — || — || — || — || — || — || — || — || — || — || — || — || — || –
|-
| 2019 ||  || 17
| 2 || 5 || 1 || 14 || 3 || 17 || 5 || 7 || 2.5 || 0.5 || 7 || 1.5 || 8.5 || 2.5 || 3.5 || 0
|-
| 2020 ||  || 18
| 12 || 8 || 9 || 66 || 51 || 117 || 20 || 25 || 0.7 || 0.8 || 5.5 || 4.3 || 9.8 || 1.7 || 2.1 || 0
|-
| scope=row bgcolor=F0E68C | 2022# || || 18
| 25 || 53 || 27 || 247 || 114 || 361 || 82 || 64 || 2.1 || 1.1 || 9.9 || 4.6 || 14.4 || 3.3 || 2.6 || 6
|- class=sortbottom
! colspan=3 | Career
! 41 !! 68 !! 38 !! 338 !! 173 !! 511 !! 111 !! 100 !! 1.7 !! 0.9 !! 8.2 !! 4.2 !! 12.5 !! 2.7 !! 2.4 !! 6
|}

Notes

Honours and achievements
Team
 AFL premiership player: 2022
 McClelland Trophy: 2018
 McClelland Trophy: 2022
 SANFL premiership player (Woodville-West Torrens): 2021

Individual
 All-Australian team: 2022

Family
Stengle is nephew to former Sydney Swans forward Michael O'Loughlin. He is also related to former AFL players Eddie Betts, Ricky O'Loughlin and Terry Milera.

Legal issues
On 17 April 2020, Stengle was reported for drunk driving after being stopped by police in Adelaide’s south-western suburbs. He was caught driving an unregistered car and subsequently recorded a blood alcohol reading of 0.125. Adelaide Football Club responded by suspending him for 4 AFL matches (rounds 2 to 5) and fining him $2,500. The case went before the Adelaide Magistrates Court at 10 am on 31 August 2020, but he declined compulsory attendance, choosing instead to attend a Crows training session. The matter was rescheduled for October.

Subsequently, at 5:15 am on 28 September 2020, police stopped a taxi containing Stengle and ex-Crows teammate Brad Crouch and found an illicit drug, understood to be cocaine. Both men issued apologies.
The AFL investigated and found the pair guilty of 'conduct unbecoming'. Crouch was suspended for 2 matches, and Stengle for 4 (a greater penalty for his second offence). With their season already complete, these bans came into effect at the beginning of the 2021 season.

SA Police chose not to charge Stengle and Crouch over the drug bust, instead referring them to counselling under a drug diversion program. On 23 October 2020, Stengle pleaded guilty to his drink driving charge in the Adelaide Magistrates Court. He was fined a total of $1,671 ($900 drink driving, $300 unlicensed, $471 unregistered) and had his 6-month driving licence suspension extended by a day.

References

External links

Living people
1998 births
Australian rules footballers from South Australia
Woodville-West Torrens Football Club players
Richmond Football Club players
Adelaide Football Club players
Geelong Football Club players
Geelong Football Club Premiership players
Indigenous Australian players of Australian rules football
One-time VFL/AFL Premiership players